The Malaysia Rugby League Division 1 2017 was the inaugural season of Malaysia Rugby League Division 2, Malaysia's domestic rugby union competition. The kick off will begin on 4 February 2017. Previously known as National Inter Club Championship (NICC), this season embarks the newly, organized league structure for more clubs to participate.

Teams

A total of 10 teams will compete in the 2017 season.

  Home of Warriors RC
  Terengganu RT
  VIOBA Blues
  USM Jokers
  UTP Drillers
  RMP Pahang
  Kelleys
  Qubyx Lions
  Jerantut Rainforest RC
  Navy ORCA

Season

In preliminary stage, all 10 teams were divided into two groups of three teams, and two groups of two teams, and a single round-robin tournament was held by all groups.

Standings

Group A

Group B

Group C

Group D

Bold indicates teams that advanced to quarter-final.

Four points for a win, three for a draw, one for a loss, and no points for a bye.
One bonus point for the winning team scoring four or more tries (BP1), one bonus point for losing by seven or less by their opponent (BP2).
If teams are level on points in the standings at any stage, tiebreakers are applied in the following order:
 Difference between points for and against
 Total number of points for
 Number of matches won
 Aggregate number of points scored in matches between tied teams

Grouping Stage Matches

Week 1

Week 2

Week 3

Final Round

Quarter-final

Semi-final

Final

See also

 Malaysia Rugby League Division 1

External links
Malaysia Rugby
Malaysia Rugby Union

2017
Malaysia
2017 in Malaysian rugby union